State Road 390 (SR 390) is a two-lane state highway in Bay County, Florida. The route is signed as east-west but runs more north-south for much of its run.  The western (southern) terminus is at the intersection of U.S. Route 98 (US 98)/SR 30 and US 98 BUS/SR 30A in St. Andrews (part of Panama City).  The highway is carried by Beck Ave from this point until shortly after it crosses SR 368 (23rd St), at which point it becomes St Andrews Blvd.  The route winds northeasterly into Lynn Haven, where it is carried by Tennessee Ave at one point.  In Lynn Haven, the road eventually turns due east and intersects with SR 77 (Ohio Ave), and continues east until its terminus at US 231/SR 75.  The portion between SR 77 and US 231 was signed as SR S-390 before being given to the county in the late 1970s, and back to the state in 2016.

Further north on US 231/SR 75, John Pitts Road branches off to the east, and before the early 1980s, this road was signed as a segment of SR S-390.  This road is now signed as CR 2293 and eventually dead ends east of US 231/SR 75.

Major intersections

References

External links

Routes 390 - 399 at Florida's Great Renumbering

390
390
390